Aurorobotys aurorina is a moth in the family Crambidae. It was described by Arthur Gardiner Butler in 1878. It is found in Japan and eastern China.

References

Moths described in 1878
Pyraustinae
Moths of Japan
Moths of Asia